The Namgyal dynasty was a dynasty whose rulers were the monarchs of the former kingdom of Ladakh that lasted from 1460 to 1842 and were titled the Gyalpo of Ladakh. The Namgyal dynasty succeeded the first dynasty of Maryul and had several conflicts with the neighboring Mughal Empire and various dynasties of Tibet, including the Tibet–Ladakh–Mughal War. The dynasty eventually fell to the Sikh Empire and Dogras of Jammu and Kashmir. Most of its known history is written in the Ladakh Chronicles.

History

Founding
According to the Ladakh Chronicles, the Namgyal dynasty was founded by Bhagan, the son of Bhara in the kingdom of Maryul. Bhagan was described as warlike, and established the Namgyal dynasty in 1460 after he formed an alliance with the people of Leh and dethroned the Maryul king Lodrö Chokden (Blo-gros-mc'og-ldan) and his brothers Drünpa Aliand Lapten Dargyé (Slab-bstan-dar-rgyas).

He took the surname Namgyal (meaning victorious) and founded a new dynasty which still survives today. King Tashi Namgyal (1555–1575) managed to repel most Central Asian raiders, and built a royal fort on the top of the Namgyal Peak. Tsewang Namgyal (1575–1595) extended his kingdom as far as Nepal.

Sengge Namgyal (r. 1616-1642), known as the "Lion" King, made efforts to restore Ladakh to its old glory by an ambitious and energetic building program including the Leh Palace and the rebuilding of several gompas, the most famous of which are Hemis and Hanle.

He expanded the kingdom into Zanskar and Spiti, but was defeated by the Mughals, who had already occupied Kashmir and Baltistan. His son Deldan Namgyal (1642–1694) had to placate the Mughal emperor Aurangzeb by building a mosque in Leh. However, he defeated the Mughal army in Baltistan. His son Delek sided with Bhutan in a religious dispute between Tibet and Bhutan, which resulted in an invasion by the Fifth Dalai Lama. Delek Namgyal sought assistance from the Mughal Empire who drove out the Tibetan forces. The Moghuls withdrew after being paid off by the 5th Dalai Lama. With the help of reinforcements from Galdan Boshugtu Khan, Khan of the Zungar Empire, the Tibetans attacked again in 1684. The Tibetans were victorious and concluded a treaty with Ladakh then they retreated back to Lhasa in December 1684. The Treaty of Temisgam in 1684 settled the dispute between Tibet and Ladakh, but its independence was seriously restricted.

Downfall

The Namgyal dynasty ended in 1842 after an invasion of Ladakh by the Dogra general Zorawar Singh and its subsequent annexation.

By the beginning of the 19th century, the Mughal empire had collapsed and Sikh rule had been established in Punjab and Kashmir. However the Dogra region of Jammu remained under its Rajput rulers (who ruled under the maharaja ranjit singh) Rajput ruler were given the control of their states but under the name of Punjab and they were part of khalsa empire, General Zorawar Singh invaded Ladakh in 1834. King Tshespal Namgyal was dethroned and exiled to Stok where they still had a small jagir until the post independence political integration of India.

List of kings

The kings of Namgyal dynasty along with their periods of reign are as follows:
Lhachen Bhagan (c. 1460-1485)
Unknown (c. 1485-1510)
Lata Jughdan (c. 1510-1535)
Kunga Namgyal I (c. 1535-1555)
Tashi Namgyal ('BKra‐śis‐rnam‐rgyal, c. 1555-1575) son
Tsewang Namgyal I (Ts'e-dbaṅ‐rnam‐rgyal, c. 1575-1595) nephew
Namgyal Gonpo (rNam-rgyal-mgon-po, c. 1595-1600) brother
Jamyang Namgyal (Jams-dbyang-rnam-rgyal, c. 1595-1616) brother
Sengge Namgyal (Seng-ge-rnam-rgyal, first time, 1616–1623) son
Norbu Namgyal (1623–1624) brother
Sengge Namgyal (second time, 1624–1642)
Deldan Namgyal (Bde-ldan-rnam-rgyal, 1647–1694) son
Delek Namgyal  (Bde-legs-rnam-rgyal, 1678–1691) son (prince regent)
Nyima Namgyal  (Ñi-ma-rnam-rgyal, 1691–1729) son
Deskyong Namgyal (Bde‐skyoṅ‐rnam‐rgyal, 1729–1739) son
Phuntsog Namgyal (P'un‐ts'ogs‐rnam‐rgyal, 1739–1753) son
Tsewang Namgyal II (Ts'e‐dbaṅ-rnam‐rgyal, 1753–1782) son
Tseten Namgyal  (Ts'e‐brtan‐rnam‐rgyal, 1782-1802) son
Tsepal Dondup Namgyal (Ts'e‐dpal‐don‐grub‐rnam‐rgyal, 1802–1837, 1839–1840) brother
Kunga Namgyal II (Kun‐dga'‐rnam‐rgyal, 1840–1842) grandson

Gallery

See also
 History of Ladakh
 Stok
 Zhabdrung

References

Bibliography

External links 
History of Ladakh
History of Sikkim

Kings of Ladakh
History of Ladakh
History of Tibet
Former countries in Chinese history
Former monarchies of Asia
Tibetan Buddhist places
History of Sikkim